Evangeline is a 2013 Canadian horror/thriller film, which was written and directed by Karen Lam.

Cast

Production 
According to Lam, the script of Evangeline was motivated by reactions to the Pickton murders in the Vancouver area, and the Highway of Tears murders in northern British Columbia.

Reception 
The film is described as a supernatural revenge fantasy, about a university student (played by Kat de Lieva) who is beaten and left for dead in the woods. Underpinning the film is a religious theme: the dilemma of eye for an eye (retributive justice) versus turning the other cheek.

Awards 
Evangeline received nine nominations for the Leo Awards, winning two. The film also won two awards, Best Director and Best Cinematography, at the 2013 Blood in the Snow Canadian Film Festival.

Release 
The film premiered on September 28, 2013 in the Monsters of Film festival, in Stockholm, and opened the 2014 Vancouver International Women in Film Festival. The film was released in the United States as Direct to video production, on 8 May 2015 on Video on Demand and on June 9, 2015 on DVD and Blu-ray.

References

External links
Evangeline official Facebook page

2013 films
2010s supernatural horror films
Canadian supernatural thriller films
English-language Canadian films
Canadian supernatural horror films
2010s supernatural thriller films
Canadian films about revenge
Films shot in British Columbia
2010s English-language films
2010s Canadian films